The Battle of Geyve was a small but decisive engagement fought during the Turkish War of Independence. Unlike other battles of the war, forces of the Grand National Assembly directly fought forces of the Constantinople government, which was under Allied occupation.

References

Conflicts in 1920
Battles of the Turkish War of Independence
History of Sakarya Province
1920 in the Ottoman Empire
May 1920 events